The 2020–21 season was the 110th season in Hajduk Split’s history and their thirtieth in the Prva HNL.

First-team squad
For details of former players, see List of HNK Hajduk Split players.

Competitions

Overview

HT Prva liga

Classification

Results summary

Results by round

Results by opponent

Source: 2020–21 Croatian First Football League article

Matches

Friendlies

Mid-season

HT Prva liga

Source: Croatian Football Federation

Croatian Cup

Source: Croatian Football Federation

UEFA Europa League

Source: uefa.com

Player seasonal records
Updated 28 May 2021

Goals

Source: Competitive matches

Clean sheets

Source: Competitive matches

Disciplinary record

Appearances and goals

Overview of statistics

Transfers

In

Total Spending:  0 €

Out

Total Income:  3,550,000 €

Total expenditure:  3,550,000 €

Promoted from youth squad

Notes

References

External links

HNK Hajduk Split seasons
Hajduk Split
Hajduk Split